The 2021 Superliga Colombiana (officially known as the Superliga BetPlay DIMAYOR 2021 for sponsorship purposes) was the tenth edition of the Superliga Colombiana, Colombia's football super cup tournament organized by DIMAYOR. It was contested by América de Cali and Santa Fe from 5 to 20 October 2021.

The competition, which is usually played in January prior to the start of each Categoría Primera A season, was delayed to October 2021 due to the schedule saturation of both involved sides and a lack of available dates in early 2021.

Santa Fe beat América de Cali by a 5–3 aggregate score to win its fourth Superliga Colombiana title.

Teams

Due to the COVID-19 pandemic in Colombia causing the curtailing of the 2020 Categoría Primera A season which only had one champion instead of the usual two, DIMAYOR confirmed that the competition would also be contested by the best ranked team in the aggregate table of the 2020 season, Santa Fe, in addition to the league champions América de Cali.

Matches

First leg

Second leg

Santa Fe won 5–3 on aggregate.

Notes

References

External links
Superliga on Dimayor's website

Superliga Colombiana
Superliga Colombiana
Superliga Colombiana